The use of Multi-Operator Radio Access Networks (MORANs), also known as Radio Access Network sharing, is a way for multiple mobile telephone network operators to share radio access network infrastructure.

References

See also 
 Multi-Operator Core Network

Moran includes sharing of the same hardware such as BTS  by multiple users, this leads to increased use of the same bandwidth and also improves efficiency by rendering an increased amount network coverage for both the telecom operators.

Mobile telecommunications